The 2015-16 Hoofdklasse season is split up in two divisions of 8 teams: Hoofdklasse A and Hoofdklasse B. On 26 March 2016 DSC managed promotion by winning the play-off of the 2015-16 season against TOP. This meant TOP had to meet AW.DTV (number 9 of the Korfbal League) in the promotion / relegation play-off.

Teams

A total of 10 teams will be taking part in the league: The best eight teams from the 2014-15 season, one direct promotion from the Hoofdklasse and one promotion/relegation play-off winner.

Hoofdklasse A

Hoofdklasse B

Regular Season Table

Hoofdklasse A

Hoofdklasse B

Promotion play-off

References

External links
 General results page KNKV

Korfball in the Netherlands